Edgar Campbell Wilson (October 18, 1800 – April 24, 1860) was a U.S. Representative from Virginia, son of Thomas Wilson and father of Eugene McLanahan Wilson.

Early life
Edgar C. Wilson was born in Morgantown, Virginia (now West Virginia), Wilson completed preparatory studies and studied law.

Career
He was admitted to the bar June 24, 1832, and commenced practice in Morgantown.

Wilson was elected as an Anti-Jacksonian to the Twenty-third Congress (March 4, 1833 – March 3, 1835). He was an unsuccessful candidate for reelection in 1834 to the Twenty-fourth Congress. He resumed the practice of law in Morgantown. He was appointed prosecuting attorney in the circuit court of Marion County in 1842.

Death
He died in Morgantown on April 24, 1860. He was interred in Oak Grove Cemetery in Morgantown.

Sources

1800 births
1860 deaths
County and city Commonwealth's Attorneys in Virginia
Politicians from Morgantown, West Virginia
Virginia lawyers
West Virginia lawyers
National Republican Party members of the United States House of Representatives from Virginia
19th-century American politicians
19th-century American lawyers
People of pre-statehood West Virginia
Lawyers from Morgantown, West Virginia
Burials at Oak Grove Cemetery (Morgantown, West Virginia)